Robin Haring is a German epidemiologist, author and Professor of Public Health. In 2014, Robin Haring was appointed as full professor at the European University of Applied Sciences and in 2016, as adjunct professor at Monash University, School of Public Health and Preventive Medicine.

Academic career 
Robin Haring studied demography at the University of Rostock (Diploma, 2006) and completed his Dissertation on “Metabolic and Endocrine Determinants of Mortality” at the University of Greifswald in 2010. He obtained his Post-Doc at Boston University in the Framingham Heart Study as a fellow of the Alfried Krupp von Bohlen und Halbach Foundation in 2010/11. His habilitation on the role of testosterone as men’s health biomarker was completed in 2013 at the University of Greifswald.

Research 
 Testosterone & Men’s Health
 Biomarker of healthy aging
 Digital Healthcare
 Global Health

Books 
 Der überforderte Patient: Gesund bleiben im Zeitalter der Hightech-Medizin. C.H.Beck, München 2014, .
 Die Männerlüge: Wie viel Testosteron braucht der Mann? Braumüller, Wien 2015, .
 mit Johannes Wimmer: Fragen Sie Dr. Johannes. Ihr Weg zur besten Medizin. Ullstein, Berlin 2015, .
 mit Johannes Wimmer und Matthias Augustin: Alles über die Haut: Wie Sie gesund natürlich und schön bleiben. Ullstein, Berlin 2016, .
 Läuft bei mir! Wie man auch ohne Erfolgsregeln entspannt Karriere macht. Redline, München 2017, .
 mit Johannes Wimmer: Ein Schnupfen ist kein Beinbruch. Warum weniger Medizin oft gesünder ist. Ullstein, Berlin 2018, .
 Evidenzbasierte Praxis in den Gesundheitsberufen. Springer, Heidelberg 2017, .
 Gesundheit digital: Perspektiven zur Digitalisierung im Gesundheitswesen. Springer, Heidelberg 2018, 
 Gesundheitswissenschaften. Springer Reference, Heidelberg 2019,  .
 Handbook of Global Health. Major Reference Work. SpringerNature, New York 2020.

References 

German epidemiologists
Academic staff of Monash University

Living people
Year of birth missing (living people)
University of Rostock alumni
University of Greifswald alumni